The term Slavic speakers of Macedonia may refer to:

Slavic speakers in Ottoman Macedonia, an ethnolinguistic group
Slavic speakers of Greek Macedonia, a linguistic minority residing in Greek Macedonia.